Segen is a river that arises from Delo Mountain, central Amarro, Ethiopia. The river flows to the east, then to the north and to the west and last to the south to join the Weito River. On the western side of Amarro horst the valley through which the river flows is called Segen Valley.

Valleys of Ethiopia
Rivers of Ethiopia